Folder Size is a freemium disk space analyzer for Windows written by MindGems.  The product uses a Windows Explorer-like interface that can show data as either a pie chart or bar graph. According to PCWorld.com, as at Sep 2, 2010, the product is a little more cumbersome than necessary but overall was considered to have an edge over SpaceSniffer (freeware alternative) because it had additional functionality and provided more information. CNET observed that the program is basic, however noted that this is generally what is required of such program.

References

External links
 

Disk usage analysis software